Jordan Ju (born May 29, 1995) is a Chinese Taipei figure skater. He is a two-time national champion.

Programs

Competitive highlights

References

External links 

 

1995 births
Taiwanese male single skaters
Living people
Figure skaters from Vancouver
Competitors at the 2013 Winter Universiade